Vasilisa Davydova (born 6 February 1986) is a former professional Russian tennis player.

In her career, she won 16 doubles titles on the ITF Women's Circuit. On 10 July 2006, she reached her best singles ranking of world No. 491. On 25 August 2008, she peaked at No. 157 in the doubles rankings.

Davydova made her WTA Tour main-draw debut at the 2006 İstanbul Cup, in the doubles event partnering Olga Panova.

Partnering Maria Kondratieva, Davydova won her first k$50 tournament in July 2008 at the Dnipropetrovsk, defeating Lyudmyla Kichenok and Nadiia Kichenok in the final.

ITF finals

Doubles: 33 (16–17)

References

External links
 
 

1986 births
Living people
Russian female tennis players
20th-century Russian women
21st-century Russian women